The family Endromidae comprises just one species, which is a scarce resident in Scotland:

 Endromis versicolora, Kentish glory — eastern Scotland (Nationally Scarce A) (formerly local in parts of England and Monmouthshire)

See also
List of moths of Great Britain (overview)
Family lists: Hepialidae, Cossidae, Zygaenidae, Limacodidae, Sesiidae, Lasiocampidae, Saturniidae, Endromidae, Drepanidae, Thyatiridae, Geometridae, Sphingidae, Notodontidae, Thaumetopoeidae, Lymantriidae, Arctiidae, Ctenuchidae, Nolidae, Noctuidae and Micromoths

References 
 Waring, Paul, Martin Townsend and Richard Lewington (2003) Field Guide to the Moths of Great Britain and Ireland. British Wildlife Publishing, Hook, UK. .

Moths
Britain